This is a list of Billboard magazine's Top Hot 100 songs of 1983.

See also
1983 in music
List of Billboard Hot 100 number-one singles of 1983
List of Billboard Hot 100 top-ten singles in 1983

References

1983 record charts
Billboard charts